Mile2 is an information technology security company that develops and provides proprietary accredited cybersecurity certifications.  The company's technology security programs are utilized in the private and public sectors, including by Boeing, Canada's Department of National Defense, the National Security Agency, the United States Air Force, the Committee on National Security Systems (CNSS), the U.S. Federal Bureau of Investigation and others.

Mile2 has developed and provides 15 internationally recognized, proprietary cybersecurity certifications, which have been accredited by CNSS 4011-4016 and are approved on the National Initiative for Cybersecurity Security Careers and Studies' (NICCS) training schedule for the Department of Homeland Security.  On January 13, 2013, Mile2 entered into a collaborative partnership with Merit Network to provide cybersecurity courseware and certifications through the Michigan Cyber Range.

In April 2021, Mile2 opened an office in Canada in order to "accommodate the growing demand for cybersecurity training and certifications from the Canadian government, corporate and academia clients.". The new Canadian office is located in Ottawa, Ontario. 

The company also has been involved in training U.S. veterans for private sector opportunities in cybersecurity, holding training sessions for veterans around the nation.

References

External links
Mile2 official website
Mile2 on Twitter

Computer security companies
Companies based in Tampa, Florida
Business services companies established in 2008
2008 establishments in Florida